The 2017 belairdirect BC Men's Curling Championship was held from February 8 to 12 at the Abbotsford Curling Club in Abbotsford, British Columbia.

Qualification process
Sixteen teams qualified for the provincial tournament through several methods. The qualification process is as follows:

Teams
The teams are listed as follows:

Knockout Draw Brackets
The draw is listed as follows:

A Event

B Event

C Event

Playoffs

A vs. B
Saturday, February 13, 2:00 pm

C1 vs. C2
Saturday, February 11, 7:00 pm

Semifinal
Sunday, February 14, 11:00 am

Final
Sunday, February 14, 4:00 pm

References

2017 Tim Hortons Brier
2017 in British Columbia
Sport in Abbotsford, British Columbia
Curling competitions in British Columbia
February 2017 sports events in Canada